National Progressive Front may refer to:
 National Progressive Front (Iraq), a coalition of Iraqi political parties
 National Progressive Front (Syria), a coalition of Syrian political parties